Mälar 30 is a  sailboat class designed by Lage Eklund and built in about 120 copies.

History
Lage Eklund designed the Mälar 30 in 1933 for Mälarens Seglarförbund. The Mälar 30 was a response to the more and more expensive yachts built according to the Skerry cruiser rule.

See also
Mälar 22
Mälar 25

References

1930s sailboat type designs
Sailboat type designs by Swedish designers
Keelboats